Dragana Gegova (born 18 June 2000) is a Macedonian footballer who plays as a defender and midfielder for Dragon and the North Macedonia national team.

International career
Gegova made her debut for the North Macedonia national team on 27 November 2020, coming on as a substitute for Teodora Dimoska against Kazakhstan.

References

2000 births
Living people
Women's association football defenders
Women's association football midfielders
Macedonian women's footballers
North Macedonia women's international footballers
ŽFK Dragon 2014 players